Viola glabella, the stream violet or pioneer violet, is usually found along streams or in moist woods in northeastern Asia and northwestern North America.

Its petals are yellow on both sides, with the exception of dark purple nectar guides on the front of the lower three petals. The flowers arise from the same stems as the leaves. Viola glabella is a perennial herb, growing to 0.1 m (0ft 4in) by 0.2 m (0ft 8in) and blooming from April to July.  The plant is deciduous and dies back completely to its roots during Autumn.

Viola glabella prefers moist, well-drained soil and can grow in part shade. Acidic and neutral soils are suitable for Viola glabella, which prefers a pH between 6 and 6.5, and becomes chlorotic if the pH is too high.

Young leaves and flower buds are edible, raw or cooked, but the yellow flowers can cause diarrhoea.

References

Hitchcock, Charles Leo and Cronquist, Arthur. Flora of the Pacific Northwest. University of Washington Press, .
Kozloff, Eugene N. Plants and Animals of the Pacific Northwest. .
Pojar, Jim and MacKinnon, Andy. Plants of Coastal British Columbia. Lone Pine Publishing, .

External links
Jepson Manual Treatment
Washington Burke Museum
Photo gallery

glabella